The 1889 FA Cup final was contested by Preston North End and Wolverhampton Wanderers at the Kennington Oval.

Preston won 3–0, with goals by Fred Dewhurst, Jimmy Ross and Sam Thomson.

This completed the "Double" for the victors, Preston having already won the inaugural Football League title without losing a game, a feat which earned them the nickname "The Invincibles".

Match details

Route to the Final

External links
 Match report at www.fa-cupfinals.co.uk

1889
Final
Preston North End F.C. matches
Wolverhampton Wanderers F.C. matches
March 1889 sports events
1889 sports events in London